Cornelius Springer Hamilton (January 2, 1821 – December 22, 1867) was a U.S. Representative from Ohio.

Biography 
Born in Gratiot, Ohio, Hamilton attended the common schools and Denison University. He moved with his parents to Union County in 1839, where he engaged in agricultural pursuits with his father. He studied law, and was admitted to the bar in 1845, commencing practice in Marysville, Ohio. He acted as a land appraiser and assessor in 1845, after which he served as delegate to the State constitutional convention 1850-1851. He was editor and proprietor of the Marysville Tribune 1850-1853. He then served as member of the State senate in 1856 and 1857, and was appointed by President Lincoln assessor of the eighth congressional district of Ohio in 1862 and served until 1866.

Hamilton was elected as a Republican to the Fortieth Congress and served from March 4, 1867, until his death, December 22, 1867. Hamilton was beaten to death by his apparently deranged son, Thomas, with a board while the two fed livestock at the family farm in Marysville. Thomas Hamilton then pursued his mother, younger brother John, and members of the local community with an axe, injuring but not killing anyone else.

He was interred in Oakdale Cemetery in Marysville.

See also
 List of assassinated American politicians
 List of United States Congress members who died in office (1790–1899)
 List of United States Congress members killed or wounded in office

References

Sources

1821 births
1867 deaths
19th-century American journalists
19th-century American lawyers
19th-century American male writers
19th-century American newspaper publishers (people)
19th-century American politicians
American male journalists
Deaths by beating in the United States
Denison University alumni
Journalists from Ohio
Ohio Constitutional Convention (1850)
Ohio lawyers
Republican Party Ohio state senators
Patricides
People from Gratiot, Ohio
People from Marysville, Ohio
People murdered in Ohio
Republican Party members of the United States House of Representatives from Ohio